Happiness Okafor is a Nigerian professional cyclist. She won a gold medal while representing Nigeria in the women's time trial cycling event alongside Rosemary Marcus, Glory Odiase, and Gripa Tombrapa at the 2015 All-Africa Games in Congo Brazzaville.

References

Year of birth missing (living people)
Living people
People from Delta State
Nigerian female cyclists
African Games medalists in cycling
African Games gold medalists for Nigeria
Competitors at the 2015 African Games
21st-century Nigerian women